Mailloux is a surname.

Persons 
Notable people with the surname include:

 Barry J. Mailloux (19??-1982), Canadian computer scientist, editor and professor
 Élie Mailloux (1830–1893), Canadian politician
 Élodie Mailloux (1865–1937), Canadian nun and nursing school administrator
 Eugene Mailloux (1878–1929), Canadian businessman
 Pierre Mailloux (1949-), Canadian psychiatrist and radio host
 Raymond Mailloux (1918–1995), Canadian politician

See also 
 Mailloux River, a tributary of the north shore of the St. Lawrence River, in La Malbaie, Charlevoix-Est Regional County Municipality, Capitale-Nationale, Quebec, Canada

French-language surnames